Mary Slattery may refer to:

Mary Slattery, first wife of American playwright Arthur Miller
 Mary Raphael Slattery (1863–1940), Superior General of the Sisters of Providence of Saint Mary-of-the-Woods, Indiana